"Le jour viendra" is a single from Khaled's album Sahra.

Track listings

CD Single 
"Le Jour Viendra" (4:41)
"Raikum" (inédit) (5:14)

12" Single
"Le jour viendra" (Disco Insane Mix) (4:30)
"Le jour viendra" (Version Instrumentale) (4:30)

Charts

Weekly charts

Year-end charts

References

1997 singles
Khaled (musician) songs
1997 songs
Barclay (record label) singles